Methuen High School is a public secondary school located in the city of Methuen, Massachusetts, United States. Methuen High serves grades nine through twelve for about 1,900 students. It is one of five public schools in Methuen and it is the only high school in the district.

Environment
The school was originally designed with the open classroom theory. Since then, a $100 million renovation has been conducted and all classrooms now have walls. Also due in part to the renovation, students now receive iPads which they keep for the entire year. This is known as the 1:1 iPad program.

The high school itself is divided into several "houses." The South wing, or South House, holds mathematics, science, business and computer classes. The North House holds classrooms for English and Foreign Languages, including Spanish, Italian, and French. The field house holds theater, JROTC, and physical education classes.

Athletics
Methuen High is a member of the Merrimack Valley Athletic Conference. The school offers 25 sports at the Varsity, Junior Varsity, and Freshmen levels. For boys: football, soccer, cross country, golf, basketball, indoor track, ice hockey, wrestling, tennis, volleyball, baseball, outdoor track, and lacrosse. For girls: field hockey, soccer, cross country, volleyball, swimming & diving, cheerleading, gymnastics, basketball, indoor track, tennis, outdoor track, and softball. Methuen teams play as the Rangers, inspired by Methuen native Robert Rogers and his foundation of Rogers' Rangers, which eventually led to the formation of the United States Army Rangers. Methuen High School also has a marching band which competes in the NESBA conference.

Notable alumni

Steve Bedrosian, former MLB pitcher for the Atlanta Braves, Philadelphia Phillies, San Francisco Giants
Susie Castillo, Miss USA 2003, MTV VJ 
Amanda Conway, professional ice hockey player with the Connecticut Whale
Ben Cosgrove, composer and  multi-instrumentalist
Sean Furey, two-time United States Olympic Team member (2012, 2016) - Javelin
Calvin Kattar, professional Mixed Martial Artist, current UFC Featherweight
Gary McLain, former Villanova men's basketball player

References

Merrimack Valley Conference
Buildings and structures in Methuen, Massachusetts
Schools in Essex County, Massachusetts
Public high schools in Massachusetts